Slawinski or Sławiński (feminine: Sławińska, plural: Sławińscy) is a Polish surname. Notable people with the surname include:

 Adam Sławiński (born 1935), Polish composer
 Agnieszka Sławińska, Polish operatic soprano
 Andrzej Sławiński (born 1951), Polish economist
  (1934–2014), Polish literary theorist
 Joseph Slawinski (died 1983), American artist
 Kendra Slawinski (born 1962), English netball player
 Stanisław Sławiński (born 1948), Polish university lecturer

See also
 

Polish-language surnames